William Gordon Kline (June 21, 1882 – after 1942) was an American college football, baseball and basketball coach.  At different times, Kline served as the head coach of the Nebraska Cornhuskers baseball, basketball and football teams, as well as the Florida Gators baseball, basketball and football teams.

Early life 

Kline was born in Salem, Illinois in 1882, and graduated from Amboy High School in Amboy, Illinois.  He attended the University of Illinois at Urbana-Champaign, where he played halfback for the Illinois Fighting Illini football team and was also a hurdler for the Illini track & field team.  He graduated with a Bachelor of Arts degree in literature and arts in 1906.

Professor, coach and author 

Kline was a professor at the former Hedding College in Abingdon, Illinois from 1908 to 1911.  From 1911 to 1918, he was the athletic director at Nebraska Wesleyan University in Lincoln, Nebraska.  He attended law school at the University of Michigan in Ann Arbor, Michigan in 1917, and earned a Bachelor of Laws degree from the University of Nebraska in Lincoln.

In 1918, Kline was a professor at the University of Nebraska in Lincoln, and he became the head coach of the war-time depleted Nebraska Cornhuskers football team.  Because of World War I and the 1918 influenza pandemic, the 1918 Huskers did not play their usual Missouri Valley Conference schedule, and, in fact, played the teams from two military training installations.  Kline's Huskers posted a 2–3–1 record.  The highlight of his season coaching Nebraska came when the Huskers played the Notre Dame Fighting Irish football team to a scoreless tie.

From 1919 to 1923, Kline was a law professor at the University of Florida College of Law in Gainesville, Florida, while also serving as the head coach of the Florida Gators football team in 1920, 1921 and 1922.  While teaching U.S. Constitutional Law, Federal Procedure and Bankruptcy, and several other commercial law classes, he compiled a 19–8–2 record in three seasons as the Gators football coach.  During his time at Florida, he also coached the Gators baseball team for one 4–10 season in 1921, and the Gators basketball team from 1920 to 1922, tallying an overall record in two seasons of 10–11.

In 1923, he returned to the University of Nebraska, where he became the Cornhuskers basketball coach and compiled a 23–12 record in his two seasons there, finishing third and second in the conference standings.  In 1924 and 1925, he also coached the Cornhuskers baseball team, and posted an 18–15 record.

Kline wrote several sports-related books, including The All-American Football Coaching Course (1929), The Varsity Football Play Set (1933), The All-America Basketball Coaching Course (1933), and Football for Fans (1934).

Head coaching record

Football

See also
 List of University of Florida faculty and administrators
 List of University of Illinois at Urbana–Champaign people

References

Bibliography 

  2012 Florida Football Media Guide, University Athletic Association, Gainesville, Florida (2012).
 Carlson, Norm, University of Florida Football Vault: The History of the Florida Gators, Whitman Publishing, LLC, Atlanta, Georgia (2007).  .
 Golenbock, Peter, Go Gators!  An Oral History of Florida's Pursuit of Gridiron Glory, Legends Publishing, LLC, St. Petersburg, Florida (2002).  .
 McCarthy, Kevin M.,  Fightin' Gators: A History of University of Florida Football, Arcadia Publishing, Mount Pleasant, South Carolina (2000).  .
 McEwen, Tom, The Gators: A Story of Florida Football, The Strode Publishers, Huntsville, Alabama (1974).  .
 Proctor, Samuel, & Wright Langley, Gator History: A Pictorial History of the University of Florida, South Star Publishing Company, Gainesville, Florida (1986).  .

1882 births
Year of death missing
American football halfbacks
College men's track and field athletes in the United States
Florida Gators athletic directors
Florida Gators baseball coaches
Florida Gators football coaches
Florida Gators men's basketball coaches
Hastings Broncos football coaches
Illinois Fighting Illini football players
Nebraska Cornhuskers baseball coaches
Nebraska Cornhuskers football coaches
Nebraska Cornhuskers men's basketball coaches
Nebraska Wesleyan Prairie Wolves baseball coaches
Nebraska Wesleyan Prairie Wolves football coaches
Nebraska Wesleyan Prairie Wolves men's basketball coaches
University of Florida faculty
People from Marion County, Illinois
Coaches of American football from Illinois
Players of American football from Illinois
Baseball coaches from Illinois
Basketball coaches from Illinois
Basketball players from Illinois